The Feathertick Inn is a designated historic building located in the Rural Municipality of Estevan No. 5, Saskatchewan, Canada.  The property contains a three-story building in a Queen Anne Revival style, made of wood.  The home was frequently visited by W. O. Mitchell who was a relative of the Adolphes family that lived in the home from 1930 until the 1980s.

References

Hotels in Saskatchewan
Hotel buildings completed in 1911
Estevan No. 5, Saskatchewan
1911 establishments in Saskatchewan
Heritage sites in Saskatchewan